Hefty Fine is the fourth studio album by American alternative rock band Bloodhound Gang, released on September 27, 2005. Produced by Jimmy Pop, it was Bloodhound Gang's third release on Geffen Records following the band's smash hit Hooray for Boobies which managed to sell over one million copies in the United States and Europe. It was also the band's last album with former guitarist Lüpüs Thünder and the only album with drummer Willie the New Guy—they were replaced in 2008 and 2006 by A members Daniel P. Carter and Adam Perry, respectively. The album consists of alternative metal and pop punk songs with a heavy emphasis on scatological humor.

The album received poor reviews and holds the dubious accolade of having received the second-worst review on review aggregator website Metacritic. Despite the critical backlash, the album sold well, particularly in Europe, where it debuted in the top ten in Austria, the Netherlands, and Germany. In the US, the album peaked at number 24 on the Billboard 200.

Three singles were released from the album including "Foxtrot Uniform Charlie Kilo", "Uhn Tiss Uhn Tiss Uhn Tiss", and "No Hard Feelings". The album's first two singles were minor hits, the former charting on six charts, and the latter charting on four.

Music
"Foxtrot Uniform Charlie Kilo" was inspired by a joke between Jimmy Pop and "Evil" Jared Hasselhoff. Originally, the two had sent each other euphemisms for sexual intercourse via email. The joke later evolved into the song. According to Jimmy Pop, "Ralph Wiggum" took the longest to write because it required the band to sift through several scripts of The Simpsons. "Something Diabolical" features vocals from Finnish band HIM's lead singer, Ville Valo, who makes reference to the band in the lyric "Tonight belongs to H.I.M." HIM and Bloodhound Gang toured with each other in the 1990s. Eventually, the groups became close and Jimmy Pop offered to distribute HIM's CDs in America. When it came time to record "Something Diabolical," Valo was asked by the band to record some of the vocals. The hidden track is said by Bam Margera of CKY/Jackass/Viva La Bam fame.  He can also be seen in the video for "Foxtrot Uniform Charlie Kilo" driving a car shaped like a banana, and, despite popular belief, he did not direct the video. RockHard Films director Marc Klasfeld directed the video. "Balls Out" can be heard briefly in the car chase scene from the 2008 movie Drillbit Taylor.

"I'm the Least You Can Do" reuses a piano riff from "Birthday Boy", a song by Jimmy Pop's pre-Bloodhound Gang band Bang Chamber 8, released in 1990 on a self-titled demo tape.

Title and artwork
The cover depicts a large, naked white man, whose genitals are obscured.

The title and album art each have unique stories. Initially, the album was going to be titled Heavy Flow, but Jimmy Pop discovered that there was a Moby song of the same name. Guitarist Lupus Thunder and Pop have expressed their distaste for Moby in the past. After scrapping Heavy Flow, Lupus Thunder and Jimmy Pop began trading emails that featured the recurring gag "now that's a hefty fine." The band later realized that Hefty Fine would make a good name for a record. Lupus Thunder, in an interview with The News-Times said, "it just clicked in his head and [we're] like, 'Hefty fine? Hold on a minute.'" Bassist "Evil" Jared Hasselhoff and Lupus Thunder have also gone on the record stating that the name could be a play on words meaning an attractive, obese person.

As for the cover art, there are several stories. According to "Evil" Jared Hasselhoff, the cover art was originally intended to feature an obese African-American woman, but Geffen insisted that the band change it. According to former guitarist Lupus Thunder, the cover model, Carlin Langley, was chosen out of several applicants. Potential models were asked to send in a picture and a bio, but Carlin Langley sent in a photograph of himself performing fellatio on another man. The band was impressed by Langley's sense of humor and hired him. Carlin Langley went on to post in the official Bloodhound Gang forums, under the user name "Hefty Fine."

Release and promotion
Sometime in 2006, Bloodhound Gang launched a campaign to have the Pennsylvania state anthem changed to their song, "Pennsylvania". The outcome is unknown. A follow-up single (and its accompanying video) entitled 'Screwing You On The Beach At Night' was released in 2007, an alternate version of the video features former porn actors Till Kraemer and Leonie Saint fornicating while the band is performing around them.

As of April 2021, Hefty Fine is the only Bloodhound Gang album not to be released on vinyl.

Reception

Critical response

Hefty Fine was panned by music critics. The review aggregator website Metacritic gave the album an average score of 28/100 from ten reviews, making it the second-worst-reviewed album ever at the website.

Chart performance

On October 15, 2005, Hefty Fine debuted and peaked on the Billboard 200 at number 24, selling 38,066 copies. The next week, the album fell to number 64, selling an additional 23,665 copies. On its sixth, and final week, the album dropped to number 181, disappearing off the chart the following week. The album spent a total of six weeks on the chart.

Track listing

After "No Hard Feelings" ends, there is four minutes of silence before Bam Margera says "This is Bam and hidden tracks shit dicks out" at 9:11.

Credits

Band members
Jimmy Pop – lead vocals, guitar, samples, production
Lüpüs Thünder – backing vocals, guitar
Willie The New Guy – drums
Evil Jared – bass
DJ Q-Ball – backing vocals, turntables, keys, programming
Other personnel
Rich Gavalis – engineer, editing, mixing
Natasha Thorp – guest vocals on "Uhn Tiss Uhn Tiss Uhn Tiss"
Ville Valo – guest vocals on "Something Diabolical"
Bam Margera - vocals on "No Hard Feelings"

Production
Ave – Producer
Adam Ayan – Mastering
Holmes Hiebert – Graphic Design, Art Direction, Photography
 Thorsten König – Executive Producer
 Adam Kontis – Assistant Engineer
 Carlin Langley – Model
 Avery Lipman – Executive Producer
 Monte Lipman – Executive Producer
 Paul Orescan – Product Manager
 Jason Perry – Assistant Engineer
 Jimmy Pop – Producer
 Jordan Schur – Executive Producer
 Les Scurry – Production Coordination

Charts and certifications

Charts

Singles

References

External links
 

Bloodhound Gang albums
2005 albums
Geffen Records albums